The Poland national football team has represented Poland in men's international tournaments football competitions since their first match in 1921. The team is controlled by the Polish Football Association (PZPN), the governing body for football in Poland.

Poland have competed at nine FIFA World Cups, with their first appearance being in 1938, where they were eliminated by Brazil. The country's best result was a bronze medal, which Poland won in 1974 and 1982; this era is regarded as the golden era of Polish international football. At the UEFA European Championship, Poland's best result was a quarter-final appearance at the 2016 tournament before losing to eventual champions Portugal. Overall, they have competed in four European Championship since their debut in 2008. They were co-hosts of the 2012 edition, along with Ukraine. Overall, Poland's best ever result at an international football tournament was the gold medal won at the 1972 Munich Olympics, along with winning the silver medal at the 1976 Montreal Olympics and at the 1992 Barcelona Olympics.

History

Before independence
The first Polish football clubs were Lechia Lwów (1903), Czarni Lwów (1903), Pogoń Lwów (1904), KS Cracovia (1906) and Wisła Kraków (1906). The Polish national federation, called the Polish Football Union (Polski Związek Piłki Nożnej, PZPN), was founded on 20 December 1919, in Kraków when 31 delegates elected Edward Cetnarowski as the first president. The PZPN joined FIFA in 1923 and UEFA in 1955.

In a similar fashion to other European states, football appeared in Poland in the late 19th century. In 1888 Prof. Henryk Jordan, a court physician of the Habsburgs and the pioneer of sports in Poland, opened a sports park in Kraków's Błonia, a large open space surrounding the demolished city walls of that town. The park, along with the Sokół society founded in 1867, became the main centres to promote sports and healthy living in Poland. It was Jordan who began promoting football as a healthy sport in the open air; some sources also credit him with bringing the first football to Poland from his travels to Brunswick in 1890. Other sources mention Dr. Edmund Cenar as the one to bring the first ball and the one to translate The Cambridge Rules and parts of the International Football Association Board regulations to Polish language.

On 14 July 1894 during the Second Sokół Jamboree in Lwów at the General National Exhibition a short football match was played between the Sokół members of Lwów and those from Kraków. It lasted only six minutes and was seen as a curiosity rather than a potentially popular sport. Nevertheless, it was the first recorded football match in Polish history. The Lwów team won after Włodzimierz Chomicki scored the only goal - the first known goal in Polish history.

This match precipitated the popularity of the new sport in Poland. Initially the rules and regulations were very simplified, with the size of the field and the ball varying greatly. Despite being discouraged by many educational societies and the state authorities, the new sport gained extreme popularity among pupils of various gymnasiums in Galicia. The first football teams were formed and in 1903–1904, four Lwów-based gymnasiums formed their own sport clubs: the IV Gymnasium for Boys formed a club later renamed to Pogoń Lwów, while the pupils of the I and II State Schools formed the Sława Lwów club, later renamed to Czarni Lwów. In the same season the Lechia Lwów was also formed. It is uncertain which of the clubs was created first as they were initially poorly organized; however, the Czarni Lwów are usually credited as being the first Polish professional football team. The following year, the popularity of the sport spread to nearby Rzeszów where Resovia Rzeszów was formed, while in the German-held part of Poland, the 1. FC Katowice and Warta Poznań were formed.

On 6 June 1906 a representation of Lwów youth came to Kraków for a repeat match, this time composed of two already organized teams, the Czarni and the team of the IV Gymnasium. Kraków's representation was badly beaten in both meetings (4-0 and 2-0 respectively). The same summer the Buffalo Bill Wild West Show set up camp at Kraków's Błonia, right outside of the traditional playground area and Jordan's garden. On 5 August 1906 the team of the Kraków-based Jan Sobieski Gymnasium played a match against the British and American members of Buffalo Bill's troupe, winning 1–0. The only goal scored by Stanisław Szeligowski was also the first goal scored by a Polish team in an international meeting. The success led to the popularisation of football in Kraków and to creation of the first Kraków-based professional football team, KS Cracovia initially composed primarily of students of the Jan Sobieski Gymnasium. By the autumn of that year there were already 16 teams in Kraków, including Wisła Kraków. (It is said that actually Wisła Kraków was the first professional football team and not Cracovia). In 1911, a Kraków-based Union of Polish Football for Galicia was formed and entered the Austrian Football Association. The union inspired the creation of a number of teams.

After the outbreak of World War I, most of the Galician football players, many of them members of either Strzelec or Sokół, joined Piłsudski's Polish Legions. The unit, fighting alongside the Austro-Hungarian Army, fought mostly in various parts of Russian-held Poland, which led to popularisation of the new sport in other parts of partitioned Poland. Eventually, Poland regained its independence in 1918 and football of Poland officially began.

1919–1939: Early years

The first football federation was established on 25 June 1911 in Lwów as the Polish Football Union (Związek Polski Piłki Nożnej). After World War I, members of PFU established the Polish Football Federation (Polski Związek Piłki Nożnej) in Warsaw on 20 December 1919. Two years later, they appointed Hungarian-born Jesza Poszony as the first coach of the Polish national team. Poland played its first official international match on 18 December 1921 in Budapest, where the side lost to Hungary 1–0. Their first international win came on 28 May 1922 when they took on Sweden in Stockholm and beat them 2–1. 
Józef Klotz scored the first-ever goal for the national football team in that game.  Poland qualified for their first World Cup in 1937 when they beat Yugoslavia 4–0 and lost 1–0 in the two qualifying matches and ensured their place in the 1938 World Cup in France.

During their debut in the World Cup, Poland played Brazil and sent them to extra time, only to lose 6–5. Ernest Wilimowski, who played for Ruch Chorzów at the time, scored four of Poland's five goals.

Poland played what would be their last international match before the outbreak of World War II against Hungary, the runners-up in the 1938 World Cup. Poland defeated Hungary 4–2.

1939–1945: Ban on football under the occupation
When the Wehrmacht invaded Poland in September 1939, all Polish institutions and associations were dissolved, including the Polish Football Association PZPN. The German occupying forces forbade Poles to organise football matches. Consequently, there was no national team.

Nine former national players were murdered by the German occupying forces. Three of them were killed in Auschwitz: Marian Einbacher, Adam Knioła (both Warta Poznań) and Antoni Łyko (Wisła Kraków). Stefan Fryc (Cracovia) and Bronisław Makowski (Wisła Kraków), who were both active in the resistance, were killed in mass shootings. Four Jewish players were murdered in Jewish ghettos: Józef Klotz, Zygmunt Krumholz (both Jutrzenka Kraków), Leon Sperling (Cracovia) and Zygmunt Steuermann (Hasmonea Lwów), brother of actress and Hollywood screenwriter Salka Viertel.

1946–1974: Beginnings of the rise

On 11 June 1946, following the aftermath of World War II, Poland played their first international friendly match, a 3–1 defeat against Norway in Oslo. Poland's biggest success in the early years after the war was their victory against one of Europe's best at the time, Czechoslovakia. Poland defeated their southern neighbors 3–1.

Poland suffered the worst defeat in the team's history on 26 April 1948 with a 0–8 loss to the Danish side. 15 years later, they posted their second highest-ever victory in Szczecin when they defeated Norway 9–0 on 4 September 1963. The game marked the debut for Włodzimierz Lubański, who scored one goal in the game. Lubański became the all-time top scorer for Poland while playing from 1963 to 1980, scoring 48 goals in 75 appearances. The game remained their highest victory until the score was surpassed on 1 April 2009, when Poland defeated San Marino 10–0.

1974–1986: "Golden Era"
For 1974 World Cup qualification, Poland faced England, who eventually missed out on the World Cup for the first time since 1946.

In their opening match of the 1974 World Cup, Poland met Argentina. Within eight minutes Poland were up 2–0 as Grzegorz Lato opened the scoring in the seventh minute and just a minute later Andrzej Szarmach doubled the lead. In the 60th minute, Argentina cut the lead in half when Ramon Heredia scored. Two minutes later, however, Lato scored his second, which turned out to be the winning goal as Carlos Babington gave Argentina their second in the 66th. The match finished 3–2 as Poland won.

Poland thrashed Haiti 7–0 in their second game, with a hat-trick from Szarmach and two goals from Lato. In their final match of the group stage, Poland met Italy. Poland were already through to the second round but needed at least a draw to win the group. Poland defeated Italy 2–1, finishing at the top of the group. In the second round, Poland first won 1–0 against Sweden, who had not conceded any goals in their first three matches. Lato scored the only goal of the game. In the next game, Yugoslavia conceded a penalty from Poland in the 24th minute, and Stanislav Karasi tied it up for Yugoslavia in the 43rd. Lato scored the winning goal.

Poland faced hosts West Germany in the rain; Gerd Müller scored the winning goal in the 76th minute for West Germany. The Poles eventually defeated Brazil in the third place match.

In 1978 World Cup qualifying, Poland denied Portugal their second World Cup appearance and their first in 12 years. In the World Cup, Grzegorz Lato scored the only goal against African side Tunisia in the second match. In the final first-round match Poland met Mexico, with a 3–1 win.

In the second round, Poland met three South American teams. In 1974, Poland had played and won against both Argentina and Brazil; both teams would get their revenge this time around. First, Argentina beat the Poles 2–0 with two goals from tournament top scorer Mario Kempes. Poland then defeated Peru 1–0 with a goal from Andrzej Szarmach. In Poland's last match of this World Cup, Brazil opened the scoring in the 12th minute on a goal from Nelinho. Even though Lato equalized one minute before half-time, it was not to be for Poland: two goals from Roberto in the 57th and 62nd minutes wrapped up a 3–1 win for Brazil.

On 29 November 1980, a dispute between players and technical staff began at a hotel in Warsaw, ending in the Okęcie Airport. Following the incident, several players of the Poland national team were banned from international duty, and Ryszard Kulesza resigned as head coach of the team. At the 1982 FIFA World Cup, Poland were drawn in a group with Italy, Cameroon and Peru. The first two games were consecutive 0–0 draws with Italy and Cameroon, but the final group game of the first round ended in a 5–1 win for Poland, meaning they would advance to the second round as group winners.

In the first game of the second round, Poland beat Belgium 3–0 with a hat-trick from Boniek securing a classic performance in the match, though the player would receive a yellow card in the following game. Nevertheless, Poland advanced as group winners to the knockout stage. However, Poland would eventually be stopped in the semi-finals, losing 0–2 to Italy and ending the dream of playing at the World Cup final once again; however, they also securing a place in the third place play-off. In the third place play-off, Poland beat France 3–2, with the game also being regarded as "the end of the golden era of Polish football".

In 1986 FIFA World Cup qualifying, Poland finished top of their qualifying group, with 3 wins, 2 draws and 1 defeat. Poland's biggest win of the qualifying phase was a 4–1 win over Greece; meanwhile Poland's biggest defeat was a 0–2 defeat to Belgium.

At the 1986 FIFA World Cup, Poland were drawn into a group with England, Morocco and Portugal. The first match was a 0–0 draw against Morocco; in the second match, Poland beat Portugal 1–0. In the final group game, they lost 0–3 to England, but Poland still advanced into the knockout stage as a result of Morocco winning 3–1 over Portugal. In the round of sixteen, Poland were eliminated after suffering a 4–0 defeat to Brazil.

1986–2001: Decline
After the "Golden Era" from the 1970s and 1980s, Poland suffered a severe drought in international football; they did not qualify for three consecutive editions of the FIFA World Cup, from 1990 to 1998.

In 1990 World Cup qualifying, Poland finished 3rd in the qualifying group, behind Sweden and England. They finished on 5 points with two wins, one draw and three defeats. They began qualifying for the 1990 edition with a 1–0 win over Albania, before losing to Sweden (2–1) and England (3–0). Poland then drew 0–0 with England, lost to Sweden 2–0 and beat Albania 2–1 in their final game, but were 4 points behind England, thus failing to qualify.

In 1994 World Cup qualifying, Poland finished 4th in the qualifying group, behind Norway, the Netherlands and England. Poland began qualifying with a 1–0 win over Turkey, followed by a 2–2 draw with the Netherlands, a 1–0 win over San Marino, and a 3–0 win in the reverse fixture. Afterwards, Poland drew 1–1 with England, before falling to a 0–3 defeat in the reverse fixture. Poland would then go on to suffer consecutive defeats, losing 1–0 and 3–0 to Norway, followed by a 2–1 defeat to Turkey and a 1–3 defeat to the Netherlands in the final fixture.

In Euro 1996 qualifying, Poland drew a qualifying group with Romania, France, Slovakia, Israel and Azerbaijan. Poland lost 2–1 to Israel in the first game, and then recorded a 1–0 win over Azerbaijan and a 0–0 draw with France. Later, Poland lost 2–1 to Romania and beat Israel 4–3 and Slovakia 5–0 before consecutive draws with France (1–1) and Romania (0–0). Poland lost 4–1 to Slovakia in the penultimate qualifying game, and drew 0–0 with Azerbaijan in the final group game.

In 1998 World Cup qualifying, Poland finished 3rd behind England and Italy. They began qualifying with a 2–1 loss to England before beating Moldova (2–1) and drawing 0–0 with Italy. Afterwards, they suffered successive defeats to Italy (3–0) and England (0–2). They won the next two games with scores of 4–1 over Georgia and 3–0 over Moldova, with Andrzej Juskowiak scoring a hat-trick against the latter. The final game was against Georgia, with Poland losing 0–3.

During UEFA Euro 2000 qualifying, Poland was drawn in a group with England, Sweden, Bulgaria and Luxembourg. Poland finished third, tied with England in points earned, but failed to qualify due to goal difference.

2001–2006: Rebuild

Poland qualified for the 2002 World Cup, their first appearance at the World Cup since 1986. Poland's biggest win overall in the qualifying phase was a 4–0 win over Armenia, while their biggest defeat was a 4–1 defeat to Belarus.

The Polish drew a group featuring hosts South Korea, the United States and Portugal. The first match was played against the hosts on 4 June, with Poland losing 2–0. The second game was against Portugal on 10 June, which Poland lost 4–0, confirming their early elimination. Poland then played the United States in the final group game on 14 June, winning 3–1; however, the U.S. advanced to the quarter-finals after defeating Mexico in the round of 16. Despite the win, Poland finished last in the group, with a goal difference of –4 and 3 points.

Poland's qualifying for the 2006 FIFA World Cup saw eight wins and two defeats. They finished behind England in the qualifying group; but as a result of being the second best second-placed team in the play-offs, they qualified automatically for the finals in Germany. The biggest win of the qualifying phase for Poland was an 8–0 victory over Azerbaijan, in which Tomasz Frankowski scored a hat-trick. The biggest defeat of the qualifying phase for Poland were two defeats against England, losing both home and away games by a scoreline of 1–2.

At the 2006 World Cup, Poland drew Germany, Ecuador and Costa Rica in Group A. Despite high hopes from the Polish press, media and fans, Poland's campaign at the World Cup was seen as an underachievement; as Poland lost two and won one game, finishing third in the group. Poland's first match was a 2–0 defeat to Ecuador, followed by a 1–0 defeat to Germany, with Oliver Neuville scoring a stoppage time winning goal; the defeat to Germany, following Ecuador's 3–0 win over Costa Rica, officially ended Poland's chances of advancing further than the group stage. The third and final group game saw Poland defeat Costa Rica 2–1, with Bartosz Bosacki getting on the scoresheet twice.

2008: Debut at the Euro

In Euro 2008 qualifying, Poland were drawn into a group with Portugal, Serbia, Finland, Belgium, Kazakhstan, Armenia and Azerbaijan. Poland's campaign began in uncomfortable fashion, suffering a 1–3 defeat to Finland on 2 September 2006 and then drawing 1–1 with Serbia on 6 September. In the third match, on 7 October, Poland won 1–0 over Kazakhstan, with Euzebiusz Smolarek scoring the goal. On 11 October, Poland beat Portugal 2–1, with Smolarek scoring the two goals. Poland beat Belgium 1–0 on 15 November. On 24 March 2007, Poland beat Azerbaijan 5–0, and on 28 March beat Armenia 1–0. On 2 June, they beat Azerbaijan 3–1, with Smolarek and Krzynówek (2) scoring. On 6 June, Poland lost 1–0 to Armenia, on 8 September drew 2–2 with Portugal, and on 12 September drew 0–0 with Finland. On 13 October, Poland beat Kazakhstan 3–1 with a hat-trick from Smolarek. They beat Belgium 2–0 with two goals from Smolarek on 17 November, and on 21 November drew 2–2 with Serbia in the final qualifying game, thus qualifying for the tournament as the 1st place team in the qualifying group following Portugal's 0–0 draw with Finland. This was Poland's first ever Euro appearance.

At UEFA Euro 2008, they were drawn in Group B, with Germany, Austria and Croatia. Germany and Poland played on 8 June at the Hypo-Arena in Klagenfurt, Austria, with Poland losing 2–0 with two goals from Lukas Podolski. In the second game, Poland drew 1–1 with Austria, taking the lead through Brazil-born Roger Guerreiro, before conceding in the third minute of stoppage time following a controversial penalty. Poland lost 1–0 in the final group game was against Croatia and finished bottom of the group.

2010: Disaster in World Cup qualifying

In 2010 FIFA World Cup qualifying, Poland were drawn in a group with Slovakia, Slovenia, the Czech Republic, Northern Ireland and San Marino. Poland finished fifth in the group, just above San Marino, with 11 points. Poland began the campaign with a 1–1 draw against Slovenia on 6 September 2008. On 10 October, Poland beat San Marino 2–0. On 11 October, they won 2–1 against the Czech Republic. After these wins, Poland lost consecutive matches against Slovakia (2–1) and Northern Ireland (3–2). Poland then recorded their biggest ever win with a scoreline of 10–0 against San Marino. Six different players scored in the win on 1 April 2009. In the last rounds of qualifying, Poland drew 1–1 with Northern Ireland and lost to Slovenia. Poland then ended the campaign with consecutive losses to the Czech Republic and Slovakia.

2012: Hosts of the Euro
On 18 April 2007, in Cardiff, Poland and Ukraine were selected to host UEFA Euro 2012 by the UEFA Executive Committee. The bid defeated others from Italy, Greece, Turkey, and a joint bid by Croatia and Hungary. Poland and Ukraine's bid became the third successful joint-bid made to host the UEFA European Championship, after the Netherlands and Belgium in 2000, and Austria and Switzerland in 2008.

Poland were drawn into Group A, with Greece, Russia and the Czech Republic. On 8 June, the opening match played between Poland and Greece at the Stadion Narodowy in Warsaw ended 1–1, with Poland taking the lead in the 17th minute through Robert Lewandowski before Greece equalized in the second half through Dimitris Salpingidis in the 51st minute. Both teams went down to 10 men during the game. Poland's next game was on 12 June, again played at the Stadion Narodowy in Warsaw, with the game against Russia finishing 1–1. Russia took the lead through Alan Dzagoev in the 37th minute before Poland equalized through Błaszczykowski in the 57th minute. Poland's final game was played against the Czech Republic on 16 June at the Stadion Miejski, in Wrocław, where Poland lost 1–0 following a goal from Petr Jiráček. Poland finished bottom of the group with two points, prompting coach Franciszek Smuda to resign following the humiliating elimination.

2014–2021: Euro 2016 Quarter-finals

Poland was drawn in Group H of 2014 FIFA World Cup qualifying, with England, Ukraine, Montenegro, Moldova and San Marino.

On 7 September, Poland's first qualifying match ended in a 2–2 draw with Montenegro, with goals from Błaszczykowski and Mierzejewski. On 11 September, they beat Moldova 2–0 with goals from Błaszczykowski and Wawrzyniak. On 17 October, Poland drew 1–1 with England, with Glik scoring the equalizing goal. On 22 March 2013, Poland lost 3–1 to Ukraine, conceding two goals in the first seven minutes alone, with Piszczek scoring Poland's only goal. On 26 March, Poland beat San Marino 5–0, with a brace from Lewandowski, and goals from Piszczek, Teodorczyk and Kosecki. On 6 September, Poland drew 1–1 with Montenegro, with Lewandowski scoring the equalizing goal only five minutes after Poland initially conceded. On 10 September, they beat San Marino 5–1, with a brace from Zieliński, and goals from Błaszczykowski, Sobota and Mierzejewski. However, Poland lost the last two games against Ukraine and England, 1–0 and 2–0, respectively.

In UEFA Euro 2016 qualifying, Poland were drawn in Group D, with Germany, Scotland, the Republic of Ireland, Georgia and Gibraltar.

On 11 October 2014, Poland beat 2014 World Cup champions Germany 2–0. Three days later, Poland drew 2–2 with Scotland. They drew 1–1 with the Republic of Ireland in March 2015 after conceding a goal from Shane Long in stoppage time. By October, they beat the Republic of Ireland to score enough points for securing automatic qualification for the Euros.

At UEFA Euro 2016, Poland were drawn in Group C, with Germany, Northern Ireland and Ukraine.

Poland's first match was with Northern Ireland on 12 June at the Stade de Nice in Nice; they won the game 1–0 with a goal from Arkadiusz Milik in the 51st minute. The next match was with Germany at the Stade de France in Saint-Denis on 16 June; with the finishing 0–0. Poland's final group game was with Ukraine on 21 June, at the Stade Vélodrome in Marseille, a game they won 1–0 with a goal from Jakub Błaszczykowski. In the round of sixteen, Poland were drawn to play Switzerland on 25 June at the Stade Geoffroy-Guichard in Saint-Étienne. Poland took the lead through a goal from Błaszczykowski, but conceded a bicycle kick from Xherdan Shaqiri in the 82nd minute, finishing the game 1–1 in regular time. Poland then beat Switzerland in a penalty shootout, 5–4. Poland then faced Portugal in the quarter-finals; another penalty shootout occurred after a 1–1 draw. Poland lost the shootout 5–3.

In 2018 FIFA World Cup qualifying, Poland were drawn in Group E, with Denmark, Montenegro, Romania, Armenia and Kazakhstan.

Despite drawing with Kazakhstan on 4 September 2016's opening match, Lewandowski scored 16 goals during qualifying, breaking the European qualifying scoring record, as well as becoming the all-time top goalscorer of Poland.

Poland played at the 2018 FIFA World Cup, their first World Cup since 2006, in Group H, against Senegal, Colombia and Japan. Despite the group being considered close, Poland were tipped as favorites to advance.

Poland's tournament was disappointing overall; they lost to Senegal in the opening match, 2–1 on 19 June in Moscow. Five days later, on 24 June, they lost to Colombia in Kazan 3–0, mathematically eliminating them from the round of 16. They did beat Japan 1–0 in their final group game in Volgograd. Poland finished at the bottom of their group.

Qualifying for UEFA Euro 2020 was based on performance in the inaugural 2018–19 UEFA Nations League. In 2018, Poland was drawn into Group 3 in the 2018–19 UEFA Nations League A, along with Portugal and Italy. Poland was relegated to League B with two home defeats and two away draws, only to be allowed to remain on League A following UEFA rule changes.

Poland opened their UEFA Euro 2020 qualifying by a single-margin 1–0 win against Austria in Vienna. Three days later, Poland followed up their suit by beating Latvia 2–0 at home.

On 7 June 2019, Poland defeated North Macedonia 1–0 by a lone goal from Piątek. They then beat Israel 4–0 in Warsaw. Poland then lost 2–0 to Slovenia in Ljubljana. A following 0–0 home draw to Austria meant that Poland's top spot was under bank, with Slovenia approaching very quickly.

In October, Poland embattled two opponents, Latvia and North Macedonia, for its UEFA Euro 2020 quest. Poland managed a convincing 3–0 away win over Latvia, eliminating them from the competition. Slovenia's shock away defeat to North Macedonia relieved pressure for Poland, with Slovenia falling from second to fourth place. Eventually, Poland beat North Macedonia 2–0 at home, and with Slovenia falling at home to Austria, Poland qualified for the Euros for the fourth consecutive time.

Being allowed to remain in League A, Poland was drawn against Italy, the Netherlands, and Bosnia and Herzegovina. The performance of this tournament doubled as part of the upcoming 2022 FIFA World Cup qualification as playoff campaigns.

Poland started their League games without Lewandowski. In their first match, an away game against the Netherlands, the Poles lost 1–0. Then, Poland made a trip to Bosnia; the Bosnian team, including Edin Džeko, had held Italy 1–1 away before. However, Poland managed a comeback from a goal down, with Kamil Glik and Kamil Grosicki scoring to beat Bosnia 2–1. In October, Poland hosted Italy and Bosnia at home; a goalless draw with Italy combined with a 3–0 win over Bosnia made them temporarily occupy the top spot of the group. However, in November, Poland suffered a 2–0 defeat despite Italy being depleted by COVID-19. Poland lost to the Netherlands 2–1 at home, ending in third place.

Poland participated in UEFA Euro 2020, postponed to 2021 due to COVID-19. A 2–1 loss to Slovakia, followed by a 1–1 draw to Spain, preceded a 3–2 defeat to Sweden to eliminate the Poles.

2022–present: Resurgence

Poland advanced to the second round (play-offs) of World Cup qualification to determine the final three European teams that would join the group winners at the 2022 FIFA World Cup in Qatar. Poland was scheduled to face Russia in Moscow on 24 March 2022 in the semi-final of a four-team playoff bracket that also included Sweden and the Czech Republic. However, following the Russian invasion of Ukraine, FIFA indefinitely suspended Russia from all international competition. Poland advanced automatically to the play-off finals, where they defeated Sweden to qualify.
At the 2022 World Cup, Poland was drawn into the 2022 FIFA World Cup Group C, where they were scheduled to play against Argentina, Saudi Arabia, and Mexico. The first match ended with a goalless draw against Mexico. Goals from Piotr Zieliński and Robert Lewandowski secured Poland a 2–0 win against Saudi Arabia in the second match. Following their loss to Argentina, Poland advanced to the knockout stage ahead of Mexico on goal difference, to be their first qualification since 1986. During the match Wojciech Szczęsny denied Lionel Messi on a penalty kick opportunity. Szczęsny became the third keeper ever to stop two penalties in a single World Cup, with the others being Brad Friedel in 2002 for the USA and Jan Tomaszewski in 1974, also for Poland. In the round of 16, Poland lost 3–1 to France, in which Robert Lewandowski scored a penalty in the stoppage time.

Team image

Names
The official FIFA country code for Poland is POL. This abbreviation is used to identify the team in FIFA, UEFA, and other matches. The same abbreviation is also used under the International Organization for Standardization. "Polish national football team" can be translated into Polish as "Reprezentacja Polski w piłce nożnej". The team's most common nicknames include "Biało-czerwoni", which means "The white-reds", and "Orły", which translates into "The Eagles". In English, the team is also widely known as "The White Eagles", based on Poland's national coat of arms.

Supporters

The Polish team enjoys widespread support in Poland and among Polish diaspora worldwide. Some fans of the team are reportedly fanatic and often violent, with connections to Polish organized crime syndicates. Supporters of the team have been involved in a number of incidents, such as during UEFA Euro 2012, held in Poland, when Polish and Russian supporters clashed prior to the encounter between the two countries' teams.

A notable chant among Polish fans is "Polska, biało-czerwoni" ("Poland, the White-Reds").

National kits

The national kits of Poland reflect the colours of the national flag, which are white and red. Apart from minor details (in the 1920s the socks in the home kit were striped), the design remains unchanged since 1921. The home kit consists of a white shirt, red shorts, and white socks; the away kit is all red (though sometimes worn with white shorts). On the rare occasions when both home and away kits clash with the opponent's, a colours third kit is available, usually in either black or blue (currently navy blue with white-red sleeves).

The kit has traditionally been adorned with the coat of arms of Poland, i.e. the crowned white eagle. Until 2006, the coat of arms featured only the inscription "POLSKA" in capital letters above the eagle, and not, as with many other national teams, the national football federation logo. The Euro 2012 kits were the first to feature the logo of the PZPN. When the kit was first launched it did not include the coat of arms, but it was restored shortly thereafter. Since 2009, the kits have been provided by Nike.

Stadiums

Main stadiums
Stadion Śląski in Chorzów was built in 1956 and seats 47,246. The stadium was renovated to seat 55,211 and was reopened in October 2017. In 1993, the stadium was designated as the official home stadium of the Poland national team. In 2011, Stadion Narodowy in Warsaw was completed with a capacity of 58,580 and since then, it has become a major stadium of Polish team and hosts most of Euro and World Cup qualifications matches.

Other stadiums
Poland has also played at the following stadiums:

Results and fixtures

The following is a list of match results from the previous 12 months, as well as any future matches that have been scheduled.

2022

March

2023

Coaching staff

Coaching history
Caretaker manager are listed in italics.
Prior to 1966 the Polish team was chosen by a selection committee.

  Michał Matyas (1966–1967)
  Ryszard Koncewicz (1968–1970)
  Kazimierz Górski (1971–1976)
  Jacek Gmoch (1976–1978)
  Ryszard Kulesza (1978–1980)
  Antoni Piechniczek (1981–1986, 1996–1997)
  Wojciech Łazarek (1986–1989)
  Andrzej Strejlau (1989–1993)
  Lesław Ćmikiewicz (1993)
  Henryk Apostel (1994–1995)
  Władysław Stachurski (1996)
  Krzysztof Pawlak (1997)
  Janusz Wójcik (1997–1999)
  Jerzy Engel (2000–2002)
  Zbigniew Boniek (2002)
  Paweł Janas (2003–2006)
  Leo Beenhakker (2006–2009)
  Stefan Majewski (2009)
  Franciszek Smuda (2009–2012)
  Waldemar Fornalik (2012–2013)
  Adam Nawałka (2013–2018)
  Jerzy Brzęczek (2018–2021)
  Paulo Sousa (2021)
  Czesław Michniewicz (2022)
  Fernando Santos (2023–)

Players

Current squad
The following players were called up for the UEFA Euro 2024 qualifying matches against Czech Republic and Albania on 24 and 27 March 2023.

Caps and goals updated as of 4 December 2022, after the match against France, as recognized by the PZPN.

Recent call-ups
The following players have been called up for the national team in the last twelve months. 

INJ Withdrew from the squad due to an injury.

PRE Preliminary squad.
WD Player withdrew from the squad

Player records

Players in bold are still active with Poland.

Most capped players

Top goalscorers

Competitive record
 Champions   Runners-up   Third place   Tournament played fully or partially on home soil

FIFA World Cup

Olympic Games

UEFA European Championship

UEFA Nations League

FIFA rankings history
Source:

Head-to-head record
Statistics updated as of 4 December 2022. List including all matches officially recognized by the Polish Football Association (also those not recognized by FIFA).

Honours

 FIFA World Cup
  Third place: 1974, 1982

 Olympic Games
  Gold medalists: 1972
  Silver medalists: 1976, 1992

King's Cup (Thailand)      
 Silver medalists: 2010 King's Cup

Notes

References

External links

  
 FIFA profile
 90minut.pl – Polish national team at 90minut.pl 
 Polish national team news at PolishFootballOnline.com 
 Poland – Record International Players; most capped players & top goalscorers at RSSSF.com
 RSSSF – Poland men's national football team international matches 
 All matches of Poland national football team
 The Making of the Polish National Football Team at Culture.pl

Poland national football team
European national association football teams
1921 establishments in Poland
Football in Poland